Arturo Charles is a Bonaire professional football manager.

Career
Since 2010 until 2012 he coached the Bonaire national football team.

References

Year of birth missing (living people)
Living people
Bonaire football managers
Dutch football managers
Bonaire national football team managers
Place of birth missing (living people)